The panabas, also known as nawi, is a large, forward-curved sword or battle axe used by certain ethnic groups in the southern Philippines. It can range in size from 2 to 4 feet and can be held with one or both hands, delivering a deep, meat cleaver-like cut. In its heyday, it was used as a combat weapon, as an execution tool, and as a display of power. Occasional use as an agricultural and butchering tool has also been noted.

The sword's name is a shortening of the word "pang-tabas", which means "for chopping". As such, its etymological origins are the root word tabas ("to chop off") and the prefix pang ("used for").

The panabas is one of many bladed weapons portrayed in the "Weapons of Moroland" plaque that has become a common souvenir item and pop culture icon in the Philippines.

Appearance

Easily one of the most recognizable among Filipino blade weapons, the panabas is distinguished by its size and its unique, forward-curving profile. At 2 to 4 feet, it is among the largest of Filipino swords, with only some Kampilan specimens being longer.  The forward-curved shape of its blade makes it unique not only in terms of its appearance, but in terms of handling as well.  In terms of shape, similarities have been noted between the panabas and the Nepalese kukri knife, although the kukri is much smaller. Its hilt is perhaps the longest among Filipino swords, both in terms of overall length, and in terms of proportion relative to the blade.

Blade
Seen from the side, the panabas's laminated steel blade is single-edged, is narrowest near the hilt, and gets dramatically thicker near the tip, where the edge side of the weapon curves forward.

Because the panabas is primarily used in a chopping rather than thrusting motion, the shape of the actual tip varies greatly, with some specimens coming to a blunt tip, some pointed in the manner of other Filipino swords such as the Dahong Palay, and some taking on a square or diamond shape, with the furthest tip of the diamond, on the blunt back of the sword, serving as an elementary spike. There are rare panabas specimens that have an 'S'-shaped blade sharpened partially along the backside, such that the specimen is double edged at the tip.

While design work on the panabas's blade is relatively rare, among the most common examples of decorative design elements take the form of talismanic 'X' along the spine.

Hilt
The panabas' hilt, made of hardwood such as narra and often wrapped in braided rattan, is perhaps the longest among Filipino swords, both in terms of overall length, and in terms of proportion relative to the blade.  The hilts of some specimens are wrapped in metal bands rather than rattan.

Scabbard
Panabas scabbards were made of plain wood and are now extremely rare - according to accounts, largely because warriors would frequently discard them prior to a battle. Such scabbards invariably consist of two pieces of wood which are taken apart to remove the sword, as opposed to the sheath-type scabbards used by most other swords.  The weapons are also said to have been carried into battle wrapped in cloth and slung across the back.

Usage

Weapon
While the panabas is now rare and there are thus no contemporary cases of its use in battle, stories from and prior to the American colonial era describe it as being used for mop-up operations. It is said that warriors wielding panabas would form a rear guard and, following in the steps of warriors in front, use the panabas to quickly dispatch any survivors.  In terms of its function as a weapon, similarities have been noted between the panabas and the western battle-axe.

Execution tool

Because of its effectiveness at chopping through meat, panabas was known favored for use in executions. As such, the panabas also came to symbolize a datu's power - a demonstration of his ability to control violence.

Domestic use
The function of the panabas is that of a large cleaver, and this shapes the domestic use of the panabas as much as it shapes the martial use.  The noted use of the panabas as an execution tool sprang from its initial domestic use for cleaving meat and fish, easily chopping through the large tuna that are caught in the seas of the Southern Philippines. However, its main domestic use is that of clearing unusually dense vegetation.

Karit
Used as a broader term, the word panabas means "a chopper" - a description which would include the many machete-like sword variants in the Philippines, including the sickle. In portions of the Philippines where the panabas is not used, the term panabas is used to refer to the sickle, whose proper name is "karit."  It should thus be noted that the panabas and the karit are completely different tools.  A weaponized version of the agricultural scythe would be the Indonesian kerambit.

See also
Kampilan
Kerambit
Celurit
Weapons of Moroland
Filipino Martial Arts

References

External links
   Museum, showing images of various swords in the Philippines

Blade weapons
Filipino melee weapons
Arnis
Malayan swords
Weapons of the Philippines